Trichogonia is a genus of South American plants in the tribe Eupatorieae within the family Asteraceae.

 Species

 formerly included
see Acritopappus Campuloclinium Platypodanthera Trichogoniopsis

References

Eupatorieae
Asteraceae genera
Flora of South America